Bogdan Scarlat (born 8 October 1997) is a Romanian swimmer. He competed in the men's 1500 metre freestyle event at the 2017 World Aquatics Championships.

References

1997 births
Living people
Romanian male freestyle swimmers
Place of birth missing (living people)
European Games competitors for Romania
Swimmers at the 2015 European Games